Camiguin's at-large congressional district is the sole congressional district of the Philippines in the province of Camiguin. It was created ahead of the 1969 Philippine House of Representatives elections following the separation of the island from Misamis Oriental to form its own province in 1966. The district was represented in the final congress of the Third Philippine Republic from 1969 to 1972, in the regular parliament that replaced the House of Representatives from 1984 to 1986, and in the restored House from the 8th Congress onwards. It is currently represented in the 19th Congress by Jurdin Jesus Romualdo of Lakas–CMD.

Representation history

Election results

2022

2019

2016

2013

2010

2007

2004

2001

1998

1995

1992

See also
Legislative districts of Camiguin

References

Congressional districts of the Philippines
Politics of Camiguin
1966 establishments in the Philippines
At-large congressional districts of the Philippines
Congressional districts of Northern Mindanao
Constituencies established in 1966